Butt Hole Road is the former name of a street in Conisbrough, Doncaster, South Yorkshire, England. The short residential street gained fame for its suggestive name and was frequented by tourists who would stop to take photos by its street sign. Residents living on the street experienced issues with their address, as they were refused services due to the name and were the target of pranks and jokes. After privately raising funds for a new street sign and seeking approval from the local government, residents had the name of the street changed in 2009.

Description and popularity 
Butt Hole Road was a short residential street. The street featured four homes on its east side, numbered 1, 3, 5, and 7. It gained international notoriety for its suggestive naming, as the term  "butthole" is slang for "anus" in American English. In 2004, a Reuters article widely circulated on the internet about a family who moved out of their £150,000 bungalow on the street because they were embarrassed by the street's name. Doncaster Council, the local governing body, has no record of where Butt Hole Road got its name but residents of the street believe that it was named after a communal water butt that was originally located in the area. One resident living on the street initially thought the address "would be fun", but claimed that the novelty quickly wore off. After a picture of the street sign appeared online, the street became so famous that tour buses would stop at the street for American tourists to visit. The street sign was constantly stolen over time and tourists would be seen taking pictures in front of the sign with their buttocks exposed.

While it was a popular destination for tourists, businesses such as delivery and taxicab services would not serve residents living on Butt Hole Road, believing that the name was a prank. Those living on the street would also receive phone calls from pranksters making a joke about the street name, and many residents eventually had their phone numbers removed from public listings. The name of the street inspired authors Ed Hurst and Rob Bailey to create the book Rude Britain, a compilation of inappropriate place names in Great Britain, after reading an article about a couple who purchased a house on the street.

Name change 

Residents of Butt Hole Road were determined to have the name of the street changed to deter tourists from visiting the street and to put an end to the jokes made about the street's name. Planners allowed the change as all of the residents on the street were in favour of the new name. Because Doncaster Council would only replace a street sign for free if it was damaged or in a state of disrepair, the residents of Butt Hole Road had to raise £300 for a new street sign. On 22 April 2009, the street was renamed to "Archers Way", in honour of the 930-year-old Conisbrough Castle, located half a mile (0.8 km) away. Shortly after the name change, an informal Facebook petition was created to change the road back to its original name.

In 2015, in reference to the name change of Butt Hole Road, residents of the similarly-named Butthole Lane in Shepshed, Leicestershire said they planned to keep the name of their street and were not bothered by the "puerile humour" that is affiliated with it, with one resident claiming that the street is "part of the tradition of Shepshed".

See also
 Gropecunt Lane
 Fugging, Upper Austria
 Shitterton

References

Roads in Yorkshire
Conisbrough
Naming controversies
Anus